Grabos (or Grabus) was an Illyrian chieftain who is mentioned once in an Athenian inscription in 423 BC. He or his son (possibly Sirras) were the leaders of the Illyrians who supported the Lyncestians against an expedition by the Macedonians in 423 BC. The Illyrian-Lyncestian troops defeated the Macedonian-Spartan alliance.

He probably was the grandfather of Grabos II.

See also 
 Illyria
 List of Illyrians
 Illyrian kingdom

References

Sources 

5th-century BC rulers
Illyrian kings